Herbert Bristol Dwight (8 September 1885, Geneva, Illinois – 30 June 1975) was an American-Canadian electrical engineer.

Dwight was educated in elementary and secondary schools in Ontario, attended Toronto University for two years, and then attended McGill University, graduating there in 1909 with a B.Sc. in electrical engineering. He developed a method for calculating the skin effect resistance ratio of a tubular conductor and derived formulas for mutual inductance of coils with parallel axes, repulsion of coils with parallel axes, and self-inductance of long cylindrical coils.

He was an Invited Speaker at the ICM in Toronto in 1924.

Selected publications

References

1885 births
1975 deaths
McGill University Faculty of Engineering alumni
Canadian electrical engineers
American emigrants to Canada